Bolkesjø is a lake, village and resort in Notodden municipality in Vestfold og Telemark, Norway.

It is located in Gransherad by Norwegian National Road 37. It is famous for the 1994 Progress Party national convention which took place at one of the hotels there.

References

Villages in Vestfold og Telemark
Lakes of Vestfold og Telemark